Saint Namadia was the wife of Saint Calminius. On her husband's death in the 6th or 7th century she retired to end her days in the monastic community at Marsat, which later became a dependent house of Mozac Abbey 2 kilometres away.

Biography
She is shown on the Limoges enamel reliquary holding the remains of her and her husband, the Saint Calminius Reliquary, which dates to the end of the 12th century and is held in the church of the former Mozac Abbey. She is not shown on the other reliquary of Saint Calminius, which originated in the church at Laguenne (one of his foundations) and is now held in the Musée Dobrée at Nantes.

References

7th-century Frankish nuns
7th-century Frankish saints